The Guinean Handball Federation (FGHB) is the administrative and controlling body for handball and beach handball in Republic of Guinea. Founded in 1972, FGHB is a member of African Handball Confederation (CAHB) and the International Handball Federation (IHF).

National teams
 Guinea men's national handball team
 Guinea men's national junior handball team
 Guinea women's national handball team

References

External links
 Official website  
 Guinea at the IHF website.
 Guinea at the CAHB website.

Sports organizations established in 1972
1972 establishments in Guinea
Handball governing bodies
Handball in Guinea
Sports governing bodies in Guinea
African Handball Confederation
National members of the International Handball Federation